Heckscher Park is a local park and national historic district in Huntington, Suffolk County, New York. It is bounded by Madison Street, Sabbath Day Path, Main Street, and Prime Avenue. The park is roughly triangular-shaped with a large pond on northwest corner, and contains the Heckscher Museum of Art established by industrialist August Heckscher, as well as the Chapin Rainbow Theater. It hosts annual art festivals, tulip festivals, concerts, renaissance fairs, and the Huntington Summer Arts Festival. Heckscher Park was listed on the National Register of Historic Places in 1985.

Image gallery

References

External links
The Heckscher Museum of Art
Suffolk County Listings at the National Register of Historic Places
Heckscher Park (Town of Huntington Website)

Huntington, New York
National Register of Historic Places in Huntington (town), New York
Parks in Suffolk County, New York
Historic districts in Suffolk County, New York
Urban public parks
Historic districts on the National Register of Historic Places in New York (state)